Stephen's woodrat (Neotoma stephensi) is a species of rodent in the family Cricetidae found in Arizona, New Mexico and Utah in the United States.

References

Musser, G. G. and M. D. Carleton. 2005. Superfamily Muroidea. pp. 894–1531 in Mammal Species of the World a Taxonomic and Geographic Reference. D. E. Wilson and D. M. Reeder eds. Johns Hopkins University Press, Baltimore.

Neotoma
Mammals described in 1905
Taxonomy articles created by Polbot